Singida Rural District is one of the six districts of the Singida Region of Tanzania. It is bordered to the north by Mkalama District, to the east by Manyara Region and Dodoma Region, to the south by Ikungi District and to the west by Singida Urban District. Its administrative seat is the town of Singida.

According to the 2012 Tanzania National Census, the population of Singida Rural District was 225,521.

Life in the Region 

Crop farming is the main way money and daily food needs are met in this region. Oxen are used by the people; when they are preparing the land for farming. Electricity was not widely used in the region. Most of the people in the region used wick lamps for light and wood for cooking food. Access to government facilities is low in this region.

Transport
Paved trunk road T14 from Singida to Babati passes through the district.
Rural transportation is mostly conducted in the form of taxes, buses, animal-drawn carts, and bicycles. The transportation services in the region are for the most part privatized. The average cost to travel around Singida rural using transportation services is 3-5 USD per kilometer. Regulations in the rural area of singida are limited. There is little vehicle traffic in the regions, so regulations are not a priority of the local government. Vehicles are not able to travel at fast speeds because road conditions are poor.

Administrative subdivisions
As of 2012, Singida Rural District was administratively divided into 21 wards.

Wards

 Ikhanoda
 Ilongero
 Itaja
 Kijota
 Kinyagigi
 Kinyeto
 Maghojoa
 Makuro
 Merya
 Mgori
 Mrama
 Msange
 Msisi
 Mtinko
 Mudida
 Mughamo
 Mughunga
 Mwasauya
 Ngimu
 Ntonge
 Ughandi

References

Districts of Singida Region